FIFAe Nations Series (FeNS) is an esports tournament series organized by FIFA and its presenting partner EA Sports. Each tournament has member nations that compete in games from the latest incarnation of the FIFA association video game series.

Each seasons runs for a whole year, with the FIFAe Nations Cup (FeNC) is the pinnacle event.

The 2021 edition was due to take place in Copenhagen in August 2021, but was cancelled due to the COVID-19 pandemic on 26 July 2021.

Results

Editions

FIFAe Nations Cup 2022

Teams
24 teams had taken part in 2022 FIFAe Nations Cup. They were: Argentina, Denmark (Hosts), Peru, Israel, UAE, Netherlands, Poland, Italy, Portugal, Japan, South Korea, Spain, Scotland, Kazakhstan, Singapore, Mexico, Sweden, Morocco, Brazil, India, England, Canada, France (Defending champions) and Germany.

Group stage
24 teams were drawn into 4 groups of 6 teams each.

All matches in Group Stage were played by a single game. 

From group stage, top 4 teams qualified for round of 16 which was followed by quarterfinals, semifinals and the final. Bolded teams have qualified for round of 16.

Knockout stage
Knockout matches are played as two-legged match, with the aggregate score determining the winner. Extra time (and penalties) were used if there's a draw on aggregate (away goals rule is not applied in FIFAe tournaments).

Team ranking
The list below gives the official ranking of the eNations provided by FIFA:

References

External links 
 
 FIFAe Nations Series 2021
 FIFAe Nations Series 2022
 FIFAe Nations Series 2023

FIFA (video game series) competitions
World championships in esports